Run to Me may refer to:

 "Run to Me" (Bee Gees song), 1972
 "Run to Me" (Smokie song), 1980
 "Run to Me" (Angela Winbush song), 1987
 "Run to Me", a 1986 song by Tracy Spencer
 "Run to Me", a 1994 song by Double You
 "Run to Me", a 2019 song by Brittany Howard from the album Jaime
 Run to Me, the alternative name for the 2016 television movie Running for Her Life, starring Claire Forlani
 Run To Me (miniseries), a 2022 Philippine online miniseries